Mr. Natural is the twelfth album by jazz saxophonist Stanley Turrentine, recorded for the Blue Note label in 1964 but not released until 1980 as LT 1075, and performed by Turrentine with Lee Morgan, McCoy Tyner, Bob Cranshaw, Elvin Jones and Ray Barretto.

Reception 

The Allmusic review by Ken Dryden awarded the album 3 stars and states "Although long out of print and an unlikely candidate to be reissued on CD, this rewarding session is well worth seeking, even if Blue Note founder Alfred Lion had second thoughts about it and set it aside".

Track listing 
 "Wahoo" [aka "Stanley's Blues"] (Duke Pearson) - 9:02
 "Shirley" (Stanley Turrentine) - 10:46
 "Tacos" (Lee Morgan) - 6:32
 "My Girl Is Just Enough Woman For Me" (Dorothy Fields, Albert Hague) - 6:33
 "Can't Buy Me Love" (John Lennon, Paul McCartney) - 6:48

Personnel 
 Stanley Turrentine - tenor saxophone
 Lee Morgan - trumpet (1-3 & 5)
 McCoy Tyner - piano
 Bob Cranshaw - bass
 Elvin Jones - drums
 Ray Barretto - conga (1-3)

Production 
 Alfred Lion - producer
 Rudy Van Gelder - engineer

References 

1980 albums
Stanley Turrentine albums
Blue Note Records albums
Albums produced by Alfred Lion
Albums recorded at Van Gelder Studio